Haunted is the second studio album by American singer-songwriter Poe, released in 2000 after a five-year hiatus from her debut album Hello in 1995. The self-produced album was created as a tribute to her father, and counterpart to her brother Mark Z. Danielewski's novel House of Leaves.

In April 2019, eOne Music released Haunted on vinyl for the first time as an exclusive through Books-A-Million.

History
Haunted found Poe combining traditional pop notions with electronic, dance and hard rock music. The album was a critical success. The song "Hey Pretty" was released as a promo single, but Poe's vocals had been replaced with a chapter reading from her brother . It reached  13 on Billboard's US Modern Rock chart. "Wild" was planned as a third single, garnering some radio play in the Chicago area after a promotional edit was released. The single was never released commercially, but featured a shorter radio mix in addition to an acoustic/rock version of the song. The title track was used as the first song for ending credits to the film Book of Shadows: Blair Witch 2.

Haunted was also referenced in the 2002 film Panic Room. In a conversation between Jodie Foster's character and the agent selling the home containing the panic room, Sarah Altman asks "Ever read any Poe?", to which the response given is "No, but I loved her last album!".

The song "Haunted" was also featured at the end of the second episode of the video game Alan Wake for Xbox 360, as well as the Tai Chi Warmup in the Les Mills BodyBalance/BodyFlow program release number 54.

The album also featured samples of audio recordings made by Poe's father, film director Tad Danielewski. The cassettes were found by Poe and Mark after their father had died and were literally audio-letters to the two of them that spanned back as far as their birth. Thus, the album is usually interpreted as a real woman (Poe) singing tributes to her deceased father (who sings back) even while telling the story of a group of fictional characters (from House of Leaves).

Reception

Haunted received generally positive reviews. On Metacritic, the album has a score of 76 out of 100, indicating "generally favorable reviews".

MacKenzie Wilson of AllMusic gave the album a positive review, writing "Haunted is in its own class of twisted intelligence and beauty." In another positive review, PopMatterss Eden Miller wrote "Few musicians are on the same level as Poe in terms of her bravery exposing and expressing her own personal fears. While it's a bit obvious to say it, Haunted will haunt you." In another positive review, Jason Mandell of LA Weekly wrote "Those without patience for such abstractions (brief though they may be) may find Haunted tiresome. The rest of us can rejoice in its originality and thank our lucky stars that Poe had the confidence and imagination to make it."

In a mixed review, Rolling Stones Neva Chonin wrote "Unfortunately, Haunted reverberates with tired samples, rehashed echo effects and beats so plodding they could stop a metronome." Q also gave the album a mixed review, writing "The mood is too heavy for far too long, but some good songs and more cohesive, melodic structures augur well for this damaged daughter's future."

Track listing

Personnel
 Poe – vocals
 Daris Adkins – guitar
 Charlie Bisharat – violin
 Kenneth Burgomaster – keyboards
 David Campbell – viola
 Larry Corbett – cello
 Mark Z. Danielewski – vocals
 Mike Elizondo – bass guitar
 Brandon Fields – saxophone
 Josh Freese – drums
 Gary Grant – trumpet
 Jerry Hey – trumpet
 Trevor Lawrence Jr. – drums
 Priscilla Loeb – vocals
 Jamie Muhoberac – keyboards
 John O'Brien – fiddle
 Melissa Rogers – vocals
 Samantha Rogers – vocals
 Madison Rubeli – vocals
 Bill Reichenbach – trombone
 Michael Urbano – drums
 Joey Waronker – drums

Production
 Producers: Poe, Olle Romo, Matt Wilder, Matt Wallace, Mike Urban
 Engineers: Kirk Fyvie, Phil Kaffel, Chad Bamford, Danger Jay
 Mixing: Paul Leary, Olle Romo, David Thoener, Danger Jay
 Programming: Poe, John O'Brien, Olle Romo, Danger Jay 
 Arranger: David Campbell

ChartsAlbum – Billboard (US)Singles''' – Billboard'' (US)

References

Poe (singer) albums
Albums produced by Olle Romo
Albums produced by Matt Wallace
Atlantic Records albums
Music based on novels
2000 soundtrack albums
Concept albums
Experimental rock albums by American artists